Eduardo Alejandro Melo (born 11 January 1996), usually known as Alejandro Melo, is an Argentine professional footballer who plays as an attacking midfielder for Agropecuario.

Career
Melo started his career in 2013 with Nueva Chicago, appearing on the club's substitutes bench for their final Primera B Nacional fixture of 2012–13 against Ferro Carril Oeste. He made his professional debut in the following season in Primera B Metropolitana, playing eighty-three minutes in a 1–1 draw with Atlanta on 4 August. Melo scored the first goal of his career in February 2014 versus Deportivo Armenio. He scored two further goals in twenty-six overall appearances as Nueva Chicago won the 2013–14 title. He scored in his first Primera B Nacional game, in a 3–1 win over Guaraní Antonio Franco on 16 August.

He made nine appearances in the second tier in 2014, prior to joining Argentine Primera División side San Lorenzo in December. In February 2015, Melo joined fellow Primera División team Sarmiento on loan. His top-flight debut came in a goalless draw with Gimnasia y Esgrima on 11 May. He returned to San Lorenzo after just four games for Sarmiento. January 2016 saw Melo rejoin Nueva Chicago on a loan deal. He played a total of fifty-six matches and scored twelve goals across the 2016 and 2016–17 seasons. On 3 July 2017, Melo joined Atlético Tucumán for his third loan away from San Lorenzo.

He made his Atlético Tucumán debut in October in the Copa Argentina against former club Sarmiento, scoring the fourth goal in a 4–0 victory. Melo achieved his 100th career league appearance on 4 December versus Colón. On 25 July 2018, Gimnasia y Esgrima completed the loan signing of Melo. Four days later, he made his first appearance as his new club eliminated Olimpo from the Copa Argentina on 29 July. Only one more match followed, versus Talleres in the Primera División, before he terminated his loan in January 2019. Melo then penned a six-month loan with ex-team Nueva Chicago.

After five goals in fourteen fixtures for Nueva Chicago, as they reached the play-offs, Melo departed in June 2019. In July, having ended his San Lorenzo contract, Melo signed for Coquimbo Unido of the Chilean Primera División. He made his debut on 17 August versus Curicó Unido, coming on for the final fifteen minutes of the match that would be his only one for the club. January 2020 saw Melo rejoin Nueva Chicago on loan for a fourth stint.

Career statistics
.

Honours
Nueva Chicago
Primera B Metropolitana: 2013–14

References

External links

1996 births
Living people
People from La Matanza Partido
Argentine footballers
Association football midfielders
Argentine expatriate footballers
Expatriate footballers in Chile
Argentine expatriate sportspeople in Chile
Primera B Metropolitana players
Primera Nacional players
Argentine Primera División players
Chilean Primera División players
Nueva Chicago footballers
San Lorenzo de Almagro footballers
Club Atlético Sarmiento footballers
Atlético Tucumán footballers
Club de Gimnasia y Esgrima La Plata footballers
Coquimbo Unido footballers
Club Agropecuario Argentino players
Sportspeople from Buenos Aires Province